Mikey Walsh (born 22 September 1980) is a British writer and columnist.

Biography 
Walsh was brought up to be a bare-knuckle fighter in the Romany community, but being gay, he was forced to leave his family and culture in 1996.

Walsh's earliest interview was for BBC Radio 4's The Choice with Michael Buerk where he spoke about his life and what brought him to have to leave his culture. 
In 2014 and 2015, Walsh was added to The Independent'''s Rainbow List of the most influential British LGBT people.

 Books Gypsy Boy (2010) was Walsh's debut autobiography and a UK best-seller. It was published by Hodder & Stoughton UK and St. Martin's Press USA.Gypsy Boy: On the Run (2011)  was Walsh's second autobiography and sequel to Gypsy Boy, also a UK best-seller. It was published by Hodder & Stoughton UK and St. Martin's Press USA.

Film 

The film adaptation of Walsh's first book, Gypsy Boy, was in development, with the screenplay adapted by James Graham. X+Y director Morgan Matthews was set to direct, and Benedict Cumberbatch was set to play Walsh's Father.

 LGBT 
Walsh was filmed for the first time to share his coming out story for The Albert Kennedy Trust's winter appeal.

Walsh has been featured in Attitude's "Gay Role Models" issue, and has written various guest columns for Gay Times''.

References

External links 

1980 births
Living people
21st-century British writers
British Romani people
British autobiographers
British male writers
British gay writers
LGBT Romani people